Ala'a Fouad Daowd Abu Kasheh (born 23 April 1989) is a Jordanian footballer who plays as a defender. She has been a member of the Jordan women's national team.

References

External links 
 

1989 births
Living people
Sportspeople from Amman
Jordanian women's footballers
Women's association football defenders
Jordan women's international footballers
Footballers at the 2010 Asian Games
Footballers at the 2014 Asian Games
Asian Games competitors for Jordan
Jordan Women's Football League players